Ronald W. Finch (October 19, 1902 – April 19, 1962) was an American football and basketball coach.  He served as the head football coach at Central Michigan University from 1937 to 1946, compiling a record of 54–18–1. Finch was also the head basketball coach at Central Michigan for one season in 1943–44, tallying a mark of 10–6. Before coming to Central Michigan Finch taught and coached football at several high schools in the state of Michigan.  He retired from coaching following the 1946 season and served as a dean at Central Michigan until his death in 1962.

Head coaching record

College football

References

1902 births
1962 deaths
Central Michigan Chippewas athletic directors
Central Michigan Chippewas football coaches
Central Michigan Chippewas men's basketball coaches
High school football coaches in Michigan